Year 380 (CCCLXXX) was a leap year starting on Wednesday (link will display the full calendar) of the Julian calendar. At the time, it was known as the Year of the Consulship of Augustus and Augustus (or, less frequently, year 1133 Ab urbe condita). The denomination 380 for this year has been used since the early medieval period, when the Anno Domini calendar era became the prevalent method in Europe for naming years.

Events

By place

Roman Empire 
 February 27 – Edict of Thessalonica: Theodosius I, with co-emperors Gratian and Valentinian II, declare their wish that all Roman citizens convert to trinitarian Christianity, in accordance with the patriarchs of Rome and Alexandria, implicitly rejecting the Arianism of the patriarch of Constantinople as heretical.
 Battle of Thessalonica: The Goths under Fritigern defeat a Roman army in Macedonia. Theodosius I retreats to Thessalonica and leaves Gratian in control of the Western Roman Empire. 
 Rome's enemies (the Germans, Sarmatians and Huns) are taken into Imperial service; as a consequence, barbarian leaders begin to play an increasingly active role in the Roman Empire. 
 November 24 – Theodosius I makes his adventus, or formal entry, into Constantinople.
 Queen Mavia, with her Saracen forces, defeats the Roman army in southern Syria.
 Emperor Theodosius I is baptized.

Europe 
 The Visigothic chieftain Fritigern dies after ravaging the Balkans; his rival Athanaric becomes king of the entire Gothic nation.

India 
 The annexation of western provinces by Chandragupta II gives him commerce with Europe and Egypt.

Pacific 
 Easter Island, in the south Pacific Ocean, has been occupied by Neolithic seafarers under Hotu Matu'a ("supreme chief"), who about this time begin to fortify the island.

By topic

Arts and sciences 
 Important works on mathematics and astronomy are written in Sanskrit.

Religion 

 Ticonius writes a commentary on the Bible's Book of Revelation.
 A cathedral is built in Trier (Germany).
 The Council of Saragossa is held; Spanish and Aquitanian bishops condemn the teachings of Priscillianism.

Births 
 Aelia Eudoxia, empress and wife of Arcadius (approximate date)
 Alexius, Eastern saint (approximate date)
 Eucherius, bishop of Lyon (approximate date)
 Eutyches, presbyter and archimandrite (approximate date)
 Hephaestion of Thebes, Egyptian astrologer (approximate date)
 Kālidāsa, Classical Sanskrit writer (approximate date)
 Olympiodorus of Thebes, historical writer (approximate date)
 Peter Chrysologus, bishop of Ravenna (approximate date)
 Philip of Side, Christian church historian (approximate date) 
 Socrates of Constantinople, church historian (approximate date)

Deaths 
 April 10 – James, Azadanus and Abdicius, Roman Catholic priests, martyrs and saints

Date unknown 
 Fritigern, king of the Visigoths
 Samudragupta, ruler of the Gupta Empire
 Wang Fahui, empress of the Jin dynasty (b. 360)

References